Rain and Thunder is the first album released by Seven Nations, then known as Clan na Gael.

Track listing
4th Part of Clumsy Lover
Back Home in Derry
Whistle Set (The Mingulay Boat Song/Frank Mors' Hornpipe/Garrett Barry's)
From Clare to Here
Uillean Pipe set (The Blarney Pilgrim/My Darling Asleep)
Faithful Departed
4th Part of Pipe Major George Allan
For James
Talk to Me
Rain and Thunder
Si Beg Si Mohr
Nothing
Amazing Grace

1994 albums
Seven Nations (band) albums